The Stonycreek River (also referred to as Stony Creek)  is a tributary of the Conemaugh River, approximately 45 mi (72 km) long, in southwestern Pennsylvania in the United States.

Course

It rises in the mountains of eastern Somerset County from the headwater spring, Pius Spring, in Berlin, and flows north past Shanksville, Stoystown, Hooversville, and Ferndale. It joins the Little Conemaugh River at Johnstown to form the Conemaugh River. Additional variant names include: Achsinne-hanne, Gordon, and Sinne-hanna.

The river basin is in a highly scenic area but had been considered among the most degraded in the state, largely as the result of acid mine drainage from the long history of coal mining in the region. The recovery of the river has been an ongoing project of federal, state, and private agencies, and continues to progress. In recent decades, the river has become a popular destination for trout fishing.

Recreation

Following the sale of the Quemahoning Reservoir by Bethlehem Steel Corporation to the Cambria Somerset Authority, there have been periodic releases of water into the Stonycreek in order to facilitate whitewater rafting as an additional recreational opportunity. As of early 2010, there was a proposal to substantially increase discharges from the reservoir to improve whitewater rafting on the Stonycreek River.

See also
List of rivers of Pennsylvania
List of tributaries of the Allegheny River

References

External links

Stonycreek Quemahoning Initiative
Stonycreek River fisheries
Stonycreek River Rendezvous, an annual whitewater event and competition, Benscreek Canoe and Kayak Club
Stonycreek whitewater information 
Trout Unlimited, Mountain Laurel Chapter, Stonycreek River
U.S. Geological Survey: PA stream gaging stations
USGS: Stonycreek and Little Conemaugh Acid Mine Drainage Study

Rivers of Pennsylvania
Tributaries of the Kiskiminetas River
Rivers of Somerset County, Pennsylvania
Rivers of Cambria County, Pennsylvania